Franz "Bulle" Roth (born 27 April 1946 in Memmingen) is a former German footballer. He earned four caps for the Germany national football team and was nicknamed "the Bull" due to his physical playing style.

Career
Roth was a big game player and had a knack of scoring important goals in massive games for Bayern Munich. He scored the only goal of the 1967 European Cup Winners' Cup Final against Rangers in extra time, which was enough to give Bayern victory, and their first triumph in European competition. He opened the scoring in the 1975 European Cup Final win over Leeds United, a game in which Roth won the midfield battle against Billy Bremner. Roth scored for the third time in the final of a European competition, with his 57th-minute strike against AS Saint-Étienne 1976 European Cup Final enough to give Bayern a 1–0 victory, and retain the European Cup for the third straight season.

On the domestic scene he scored 72 goals in 322 West German top-flight matches. With Roth FC Bayern won 4 Bundesliga titles.

Roth is one of the most decorated players in Bayern's history and has been voted into their Hall of Fame.

Honours 
 Bundesliga: 1968–69, 1971–72, 1972–73, 1973–74
 DFB-Pokal: 1965–66, 1966–67, 1968–69, 1970–71
 European Cup: 1973–74, 1974–75, 1975–76
 UEFA Cup Winners' Cup: 1966–67
 Intercontinental Cup: 1976

References

External links 
 
 
 

1946 births
Living people
German footballers
Germany international footballers
Germany under-21 international footballers
FC Bayern Munich footballers
Bundesliga players
People from Memmingen
Sportspeople from Swabia (Bavaria)
Association football midfielders
Footballers from Bavaria
UEFA Champions League winning players
West German footballers
West German expatriate sportspeople in Austria
FC Red Bull Salzburg players
West German expatriate footballers
Expatriate footballers in Austria